was a town located in Ika District, Shiga Prefecture, Japan.

As of 2003, the town had an estimated population of 4,045 and a density of 24.13 persons per km2. The total area was 167.62 km2.

On January 1, 2010, Yogo, along with the towns of Kohoku and Torahime (both from Higashiazai District), and the towns of Kinomoto, Nishiazai and Takatsuki (all from Ika District), was merged into the expanded city of Nagahama. Higashiazai District and Ika District were both dissolved as a result of this merger.

Yogo is located in northernmost Shiga and considerably cold in winter with high snowfall. There is a small lake which is famous for a Swan Maiden legend.

References

Dissolved municipalities of Shiga Prefecture
Nagahama, Shiga